The Antel Arena is a multipurpose indoor arena that is located in the neighborhood of Villa Española, Montevideo, Uruguay. The arena has a capacity of 15,000 people for concerts, and 10,000 people for basketball games.

The arena was built by the state telecommunications company ANTEL after they reached an agreement with the city of Montevideo, which granted them the rights to the arena for 30 years. The venue is operated by American company ASM Global.

History
The arena was built at the location of the old Cilindro Municipal, after it was left in a dilapidated state after a fire. Before the Antel Arena could be constructed, the old Cilindro Municipal had to be demolished. Construction on Antel Arena began in May 2014, and the arena opened on November 12, 2018.

The arena was used to host home games of the senior men's Uruguayan national basketball team, during 2019 FIBA World Cup Americas qualifiers. The arena was also included as a proposed host venue, as a part of the Argentina–Uruguay bid for the 2023 FIBA World Cup. However, the right to host the 2023 FIBA World Cup was ultimately won by the rival Philippine–Japanese–Indonesian bid.

Concerts and shows

Major sporting events

References

External links

Antel Arena's official website 

Basketball venues in Uruguay
Buildings and structures in Montevideo
Indoor arenas in Uruguay
Music venues in Uruguay
Multi-purpose stadiums in Uruguay
Sport in Montevideo
Sports venues completed in 2018